Blood Looms and Blooms is the third studio album by electronic music artist Leila, released by Warp in 2008. It peaked at number 33 on the UK Dance Albums Chart.

Critical reception
At Metacritic, which assigns a weighted average score out of 100 to reviews from mainstream critics, the album received an average score of 73% based on 14 reviews, indicating "generally favorable reviews".

PopMatters placed it at number 5 on the "Best Electronic(a) Albums of 2008" list. AllMusic listed it as one of their favourite electronic albums of 2008. Gilles Peterson named it the 16th best album of 2008.

Track listing

Personnel
Credits adapted from liner notes.

 Leila – production
 Terry Hall – vocals (2, 14)
 Khemahl Richardson – vocals (3)
 Thaon Richardson – vocals (3)
 Roya Arab – vocals (4)
 Andy Cox – guitar (5)
 Justin Percival – guitar (5)
 Luca Santucci – vocals (6, 10, 12)
 Seaming To – vocals (8)
 Martina Topley-Bird – vocals (9, 14)
 Lance Shepherd – guitar (9)
 Zan Lyons – cello (13)
 Sabina Doobay – clarinet (13)
 Kweku Aacht – clarinet (13)

Charts

References

External links
 

2008 albums
Leila (music producer) albums
Warp (record label) albums